The following is a list of female directors who have directed, or are in the process of directing, a film based on comics (including comic books, comic strips, manga, and graphic novels). The films include direct-to-video as well as theatrical releases, and may be live action, animated, anime, or a combination thereof.

Released

Upcoming

In development

See also 
 List of comic-based television episodes directed by women
 List of LGBT-related films directed by women
 List of lesbian filmmakers
 List of films based on manga
 List of American superhero films
 List of films based on comics
 List of films based on English-language comics
 List of films based on French-language comics
 List of films based on Marvel Comics publications
 List of Marvel Cinematic Universe films
 Sony Pictures Universe of Marvel Characters
 List of unproduced film projects based on Marvel Comics
 List of unproduced films based on Marvel Comics imprints publications
 List of films based on DC Comics publications
 DC Extended Universe
 List of unproduced DC Comics projects
 List of unproduced films based on DC Comics imprints
 List of television series and films based on Dark Horse Comics publications
 List of unproduced Dark Horse projects
 List of television series and films based on Harvey Comics publications
 List of television series and films based on Archie Comics publications
 List of television series and films based on Image Comics publications
 List of unproduced Image Comics projects

Notes 
  The Wachowskis have since announced publicly their transition as trans women, with Larry/Lana in 2008 and Andy/Lilly in 2016.
  M. J. Bassett has since announced publicly their transition as a trans woman in 2017.

References

External links 
 Movies Based on Comics Directed by Women and Comics-Related Movies Directed by Women on IMDb
 Goddesses of the galaxy: women directors take over the blockbuster universe on The Guardian
 'Wonder Woman' Is a Milestone, But It Shouldn't Be on The Hollywood Reporter
 Every Studio Film Directed By Female Filmmakers Coming Out in 2019 and 2020 on IndieWire

Lists of films based on comics
Sequential lists of films based on comics, arranged in chronological order
Women in film
Comics